Harmondsworth Great Barn (also known as Manor Farm Barn) is a medieval barn on the former Manor Farm in the village of Harmondsworth, in the London Borough of Hillingdon, England. It is north-west of fields and the A4 next to Heathrow Airport. Built in the early 15th century by Winchester College, it is the largest timber-framed building in England and is regarded as an outstanding example of medieval carpentry. It was described by the English poet John Betjeman as the "Cathedral of Middlesex". A similar though smaller barn is part of the Manor Farm complex in Ruislip.

The barn was briefly in royal ownership but passed into the hands of three families who continued to use it for agricultural purposes until as late as the 1970s. It was subsequently owned by a property development company which redeveloped the farm complex. After the company went bankrupt in 2006, the barn was bought by property speculators betting on its compensation value if the nearby Heathrow Airport was expanded. The barn fell into disrepair and was closed to the public for all but one day a year. English Heritage stepped in, using a rare legal procedure to carry out repairs without the owner's consent, and eventually purchased the barn in January 2012. It is now open to the public from April to October on the second and fourth Sunday of each month under the management of the Friends of the Great Barn group.

Structure
There are three doors on the east side to permit the entry of wagons. The exterior of the barn is weatherboarded, with a hipped tiled roof. It was originally a much larger structure, with two wings, but the north wing was dismantled in 1774 and rebuilt in the now-demolished hamlet of Heathrow, on the site of the modern airport. The vast majority of the surviving structure is original; it has been estimated that 95 per cent of the timbers, including the external weatherboarding, have survived from the original building. It has been described by English Heritage as "a supreme example of late-medieval craftsmanship – a masterpiece of carpentry containing one of the best and most intact interiors of its age and type in all of Europe."

It is an outstanding example of a late medieval aisled barn and is the largest timber-framed building in England. Barns of this type were based on a longitudinal frame, with two rows of posts connected by arcade plates. Because such barns tend to be both long and high, they experience high structural loads from the wind. They therefore have numerous internal braces, acting in much the same way as buttresses, to strengthen the structure. This gives the barn its distinctive internal appearance, with a lattice of beams and braces holding up the roof. The techniques used in its construction are similar to those employed on the great cathedrals being built at the time, and some of the same craftsmen were probably involved.

The barn's main posts are made of oak. Each is about  square and sits on a block of Reigate sandstone, a common building material in medieval London. The posts were cut into shape using axes, adzes and saws, the marks from which can still be seen in some instances. The builders cut and fitted the timberwork together on the ground and scratched Roman numerals, called assembly marks, on the joints to indicate where pieces of timber were to be combined. Some of the pairs of main posts were made from the trunks of very large individual trees which were cut in two. They were all placed upside down, relative to the original direction of the tree. This was because the bottom of a tree is always wider than the top; the greater width was needed to accommodate the joints with the beams that support the roof. Despite the care that the builders took to get the joints right, they may have made some mistakes along the way, as some of the timbers have holes for pegs and mortises that were never used. Alternatively, the timbers may have been reused from another construction.

The rows of arcade posts support tie beams, with curved braces to strengthen the frame. The collar beam, which supports the opposing principal rafters, is supported by the crown post. Roof purlins run the length of the barn and are tenoned into the principal rafters, with additional support from curved wind braces. Some aspects of this design are unusual, both in the way that they are executed and in terms of their early date. A number of features in the barn's carpentry are described by English Heritage as "experimental, precocious and regionally unusual," which is attributed to the very high level of skill of the master carpenters who built it.

The use of aisles enabled the barn's architects to increase its width and by doing so, provided the maximum space for threshing floors. The longer the barn was, the more threshing floors could be provided. English barns went through an evolution in the number of threshing floors; the earliest had just one central floor, a design that became the commonest to be found in Britain. Harmondsworth Great Barn is unusual in having three threshing floors, allowing much more grain to be threshed at one time.

The boards on the exterior of the barn are made from a mixture of oak, elm and softwoods such as pine and fir. Some are of modern or relatively modern origins; those on the south end of the barn are noticeably lighter in colour than the rest and are the result of the repairs made after the 1972 fire. Each side of the barn's roof holds 92 tile courses and a total of around 76,000 tiles, which were originally held in place by oak pegs. Many of the tiles have been replaced over the years and the oak pegs have been replaced by galvanised peg nails due to the effects of decay.

The floor of the barn was originally made of hard-packed flint gravel held together with iron panning, excavated from a local gravel deposit, which was used as a more readily available alternative to stone. In subsequent years it was repaired with brick, tile and, ultimately, cement, obscuring the original appearance of the floor. An indication of how it would have looked can still be obtained from the outside of the west side of the barn.

The design of the barn has provided inspiration to a number of architects in the 19th and 20th centuries who were involved with the Gothic Revival movement. Sir George Gilbert Scott visited the barn in 1850 and sketched it, using its design as the basis for proposals for the new ChristChurch Cathedral in Christchurch, New Zealand. The library of Mansfield College, Oxford designed by Basil Champneys in the late 1880s also owes its inspiration to the barn. Bedales School's library, completed in 1922 and designed by Ernest Gimson, may also have had its origins in the barn's design.

History

The manor of Harmondsworth was owned before the Norman Conquest by King Harold Godwinson, but was seized by William the Conqueror after Harold's death at the Battle of Hastings in 1066. Three years later, William granted it to William FitzOsbern, one of his close confidants. It was subsequently transferred to the Abbey of Rouen. In 1391, it was acquired from the abbot and prior by William of Wykeham, the Bishop of Winchester. He gave it to Winchester College, which he had founded in 1382, as part of his endowment of that establishment. Its revenues went towards supporting the college.

There was already a "Great Barn" on the site, and as early as 1110 a manor record shows that men who were not wanted for ploughing were required to "thresh in the Great Barn until sunset". A granary was recorded in a survey conducted in 1293–4 and a further survey of 1324 recorded the existence of a monastic grange in addition to the granary. The wheat barn at Harmondsworth was damaged in a storm in 1398 and records from Winchester College show that two carpenters were sent to make repairs, for which a large quantity of tiles, nails and other roofing materials was purchased. By this time, however, the existing barn was evidently becoming inadequate. The college's records indicate that in 1426–7 it commissioned two men, William Kypping (or Kipping) and John atte Oke, to obtain timbers from Kingston upon Thames to use for a new barn at Harmondsworth. This date matches an early fifteenth-century origin for the Great Barn's timbers, which has been established through dendrochronology. The architect is not known, but it is possible that William Wyse may have been involved. He was the main carpenter for New College, Oxford and the master carpenter at Windsor Castle in 1430, and worked on repairing the aisles at the church of St Mary's in Harmondsworth, practically next door to the manor. Carpenters from Ickenham and Uxbridge were also involved and a tiler appears to have been employed by the college at the same time. Once completed, the barn would have been used to thresh and store grain from the manor farm.

In 1544, the manor was taken by King Henry VIII to add to his hunting estate around Hampton Court but he does not appear to have used it, and shortly afterwards he granted it to the Paget family. It remained in their hands until 1869. During the first half of the 20th century the manor was owned by the Ashby family. The last Ashby to farm there died in 1948 and the farm was sold in 1950 to Peter Purser, who died in the late 1970s. It was already a Scheduled Monument and was given Grade I listed building status in March 1950 when new heritage protection legislation was brought into force. The barn continued to be used for agricultural purposes until as late as the 1970s. It had a couple of narrow escapes during the 20th century; during the Second World War a German V-1 flying bomb flattened a nearby barn, but only managed to dislodge a few roof tiles on the Great Barn. The barn's southern bay was seriously damaged by fire in 1972 but it was subsequently restored. The building was greatly admired by the Poet Laureate Sir John Betjeman, who dubbed it "the cathedral of Middlesex". It underwent a detailed eighteen-month survey in the late 1980s by the craftsman Peter McCurdy (who later went on to rebuild Shakespeare's Globe theatre), supported by the Museum of London.

Neglect and rescue

The barn and the surrounding Manor Farm property were purchased in 1986 by the John Wiltshier Group, a builder/property developer which aimed to restore the barn to serve as a showcase for the company. The farm underwent major changes, with several of the more dilapidated buildings demolished and a new L-shaped office building constructed facing the barn. Planning permission was granted on the basis that income from the new offices was supposed to pay for ongoing repairs to the barn, following an initial renovation carried out in 1989. However, in 2006, the company went into receivership. The other buildings were individually sold to new owners but the receiver's attempts to sell the barn separately fell through.

The receiver offered the barn to Hillingdon Council and English Heritage for £1, but both refused the offer. Instead, a Gibraltar-based company calling itself Harmondsworth Barn Ltd bought the barn. The company had no other assets and it was reported that it was seeking to speculate on obtaining compensation from a proposed expansion of Heathrow Airport. Such compensation would be paid should the land be required and the property demolished, although the barn fell just slightly outside the area required for a new runway. The new owners made no effort to maintain the barn, which fell into disrepair and was closed to the public apart from an annual one-day opening in conjunction with the Open House Weekend each September.

The Society for the Protection of Ancient Buildings (SPAB) raised the alarm in a 2009 edition of its magazine, Cornerstone, in which the deteriorating condition of the barn was highlighted as the magazine's cover story. The magazine reported that on a recent visit "more than a dozen gaps in the tiled roof were seen, some large. The site appeared to lack fire-fighting equipment or alarms, and could be easily accessed. Plants have taken root in the stone-and-brick plinth, and have begun to damage the medieval blocks upon which the barn stands." English Heritage issued a statement saying: "The absentee owner of the barn has declined to engage with English Heritage (and the local authority) for some years despite our offers of help, support, advice and grants. The Heathrow expansion area would surround the site of the barn on three sides but would not, according to plans we have seen, propose its demolition or removal. However, this still leaves question marks over the barn’s future and in particular, the issues of viability and setting."

Following the publication of the Cornerstone article, English Heritage stepped in to begin legal proceedings that would lead to the compulsory purchase of the barn. It carried out emergency repairs of the barn in November 2009, without the owners' consent, under an Urgent Works Notice. The agency carried out an unusual legal manoeuvre to speed up the works, declassifying the barn from a scheduled monument to a Grade I listed building. This enabled the notice to be issued more speedily, overriding the owners' objections.

The repairs mainly involved fixing holes in the roof and preventing the ingress of rain water, as well as repairing the weatherboards on the sides. The intervention by English Heritage led to a protracted dispute over the £30,000 cost of the repairs that was scheduled to come to trial at the High Court of Justice in April 2012. In January 2012, a settlement was reached in which Harmondsworth Barn Ltd sold the barn to English Heritage for £20,000. By that time the government had abandoned its plans to expand Heathrow Airport and the barn had become a liability for the company.

Simon Thurley, the Chief Executive of English Heritage, called the barn "one of the greatest medieval buildings in Britain, built by the same skilled carpenters who worked on our magnificent medieval cathedrals. Its rescue is at the heart of what English Heritage does." The local Member of Parliament, John McDonnell, praised the hard work of local people and English Heritage staff and said that he was "now overjoyed that we have secured this wonderful building for future generations." The SPAB also welcomed the decision, calling the barn one of the "symbols of the dominance of the rural economy in the past, and the immense investment in craftsmanship and materials that agriculture deserved."

Reopening and future management
The barn is managed by volunteers from the Friends of the Great Barn at Harmondsworth, a local preservation group, acting on behalf of the owners, English Heritage. It is open to the public for free on the second and fourth Sunday of each month between April and October.

References

Further reading

External links

 
 English Heritage – Harmondsworth Barn

Buildings and structures completed in the 15th century
Grade I listed buildings in the London Borough of Hillingdon
Grade I listed agricultural buildings
Barns in England
History of Middlesex
English Heritage sites in London
Buildings and structures in the London Borough of Hillingdon
Tourist attractions in the London Borough of Hillingdon
15th-century architecture in the United Kingdom
Timber framed buildings in London
Tithe barns in Europe